Michel Parent (19 June 1924 – 30 September 2003) was a French sailor who competed in the 1956 Summer Olympics.

Michel Georges Parent was born on 19 June 1924 in Sedan. He died on 30 September 2003 in Montpellier.

References

External links
  

1924 births
2003 deaths
French male sailors (sport)
Olympic sailors of France
Sailors at the 1956 Summer Olympics – Star